The Farman F 400 was a 1930s French three-seat cabin high-winged monoplane which was designed and built by Farman.

Design and development
The Farman series "400" was a revolution for its builder because it had a thin, cantilever-constructed, high wing, with round edges, which could be dismounted for better storage and transportation.

The aeroplane had mixed construction. The fuselage was made of steel tubes, while the wings had a wood frame. The fuselage and the wings are both covered with plywood.

The F 402 has an unusual feature, which is that the control stick hangs from the ceiling of the cockpit, and the rudder control is a vertical steering wheel.

The fuel tanks, which are placed inside the wings, have a capacity of 200 liters.

The landing gear structure is constructed of iron bars, which allows this plane to land "hardly" in short space.

This aircraft served, among other countries, in Spain, during the 1936-1939 civil war, on both sides.

Variants
F.400
Three-seat cabin monoplane.
F.402
Powered by a 120hp (89-kW) Lorraine 5Pb radial piston engine.
F.403
Powered by a 150hp (112-kW) Farman 7Ed engine.
F.404
Similar to the F.403, powered by a 140hp (89kW) Renault 4Pei engine.
F.405
Powered by a 110hp (82kW) Lorraine 5Pb radial piston engine.
F.406
Powered by a 125hp (93kW) de Havilland Gipsy Major piston engine.

Operators

 French Air Force

Spanish Republican Air Force

Survivors
One aircraft of the Spanish Republican Air Force survives and is on display at the Spanish Museo del Aire (Madrid). This plane was used in Zaragoza during the Spanish Civil War as a transport, communication and ambulance aircraft.

Specifications (F 402)

See also

Citations

Bibliography

External links

Farman F.402
Paul Grieu Farman F.402 

1930s French civil utility aircraft
High-wing aircraft
Single-engined tractor aircraft
F.0400
Aircraft first flown in 1934